Billy the Fish is a long-running cartoon strip in the British comic Viz that first appeared in 1983.
Created by artist Chris Donald and writer Simon Thorp (who later took on both roles), Billy the Fish is, like many Viz strips, a lampoon of British comics – in Billy the Fishs case, that of football-themed strips such as Roy of the Rovers. The cartoon was adapted into an animated film by Channel 4 in 1990.

Background
The strip chronicles the football team Fulchester United F.C. (Fulchester is the name of the fictional town where many of Viz's characters live, first used by Crown Court). Originally the strip was produced in serial format, a rarity for Viz, but later became an occasional strip, usually appearing when major tournaments were being played or parodying major incidents in the world of football. The strip returned to its serial format for six months in 2007 as a result of a sponsorship deal with bookmakers betNOW, who were advertised in a deliberately ridiculous manner in each strip that they sponsored.

Characters include:
 Billy Thompson, the main character. Despite being born half-man, half fish, he has managed to have a long and successful career as a goalkeeper for Fulchester. Essentially, Billy is a human head (complete with mullet hairstyle) on a fish's body, who inexplicably floats approximately five feet above the ground, and propels himself with his fins and tail. The first Billy was killed saving a booby-trapped ball in an FA Cup final, but was replaced by his son, who was also called Billy and happened to look exactly like his father. However, after going back in time, the original Billy was back and everything returned to normal.
 Tommy Brown, the team manager. A bluff, no-nonsense type in a sheepskin jacket, Tommy is the second-most used character – in the past he has had open heart surgery on the pitch and (coinciding with Channel 4's The Manageress starring Cherie Lunghi) was revealed to be a woman in disguise. His catchphrase is "someone's out to make trouble for Fulchester United. The question is who?"
 Syd Preston, the team coach. Syd is usually a hapless straight man trying to make sense of events. Syd was born in Scotland, so he speaks with a Scottish accent.
 Rick Spangle, the millionaire pop star and chairman. In one strip, Spangle was revealed to be a Martian determined to get Billy to sign for his team Dynamo Mars, but of course this plot thread was never expanded upon.
 Brown Fox, a scantily clad huge-breasted Native American girl who plays winger.
 Johnny X, the invisible striker. His father was killed in a childhood accident, so Johnny has been invisible ever since.
 Terry Jackson, the unsettled amateur marksman reserve team keeper. Billy replaced him as Fulchester's first choice goalkeeper, and Jackson has since spent much time attempting to kill or otherwise discredit Billy in order to gain his place back. In the first episode of the series, Jackson shot what everyone thought was Billy, but it was actually a balloon of Billy. Later in the book series, he joined Grimthorpe City and teamed up with evil Gus Parker and Wilf his henchman to discredit Fulchester United and kill Billy Thompson for revenge.
 Professor Wolfgang Schnell BSc. PhD., a mad scientist who usually only shoots for goal after working out the best trajectory he should kick the ball at, achieving this with a calculator, various charts and a geometry set
 Evil Gus Parker, boss of Grimthorpe City (Fulchester's arch rivals.) Parker is often behind highly contrived schemes to discredit Fulchester United.  He sports a checkered cap, sunglasses, heavy stubble and is dentally challenged.
 Wilf - Evil Gus Parker's henchman. Wilf helps his boss to discredit Fulchester United so Grimthorpe City can become winners of the league trophy.
 Shakin' Stevens, the famous pop star signed for Fulchester in an early strip, parodying the time when Spandau Ballet signed up for Melchester Rovers, the team featured in Roy of the Rovers. He was later joined by Mick Hucknall, the frontman for Simply Red.
 A pair of conjoined twins, who scored a vital equalising goal in one game. The referee decided that because of their condition the goal counted double, resulting in Fulchester winning the game.
 Maxwell Baxter a supposed "ruthless millionaire," whose schemes always appear to spell trouble for Fulchester United. Despite appearing in many strips, the real Baxter has never been seen, as he always turns out to in fact be a cardboard replica with a hidden tape recorder (except for one appearance where he was upgraded to a waxwork dummy with a concealed CD player). This started a repeating gag about threats to the main characters always turning out to be cardboard cut-outs of the real person. Based primarily on Robert Maxwell.
 Rex Findley - A 64-year-old man who is blind. He scores 13 goals in the second half using a jet powered ball (controlled by Billy in the first episode). He also appears later on in the book only.

Plot elements
As the above characters suggest, plot elements in the strip are frequently nonsensical, inconsistent, and highly contrived, often being set up and then forgotten about for no reason. They include:
 Surreal turns of events, especially in order to make ludicrous cop-outs from cliffhangers. For example, at the end of one strip, a game in Japan is interrupted by Mothra, the giant beast from the Godzilla movies. At the start of the strip in the next issue it is swiftly revealed that it was actually just a harmless cardboard cut-out of Mothra. Everyone sighs with relief and the game continues. On more than one occasion, characters have awakened from perilous situations to discover it was "just a dream" (e.g. "So... it was all a dream?"; "Yes, apart from the bit about playing for England.").
 Satire of the tendency in football fiction to have impossibly competent teams steamrollering their way through the competition. Fulchester usually win a game with scores of around 5-nil – but if Billy is not in goal they instead lose by the same margin. One strip, lampooning the 'back from the brink' plot type, had Fulchester narrowly beating a team of paperboys (because their goalkeeper's mother called him in for his tea) and then moving on to the FA Cup final the next day.
 Incidents relating to real-life events in British football. For example, Billy The Fish often adopts the current hairstyle of footballing celebrities such as Paul Gascoigne or David Beckham. On another occasion, Billy shouted a tirade of abuse at Tommy Brown, for daring to order him to tie his shoelaces (even though Billy, not having feet, does not wear shoes.) This prompted Brown to drop Billy from the team, which mimicked the incident whereby Irish footballer Roy Keane was dropped from his team and sent home from the 2002 World Cup for hurling abuse at his manager.
 References to the strip's supposed unpopularity amongst Viz readers. In one strip Tommy Brown drops his trousers and defecates on his desk to prove that no-one is reading.
 A "spot the difference" version of the strip, the differences from the normal version being extremely obvious; for instance the strip is titled "Pilly the Fish", Syd Preston suddenly appears nude in one panel, and Tommy Brown is replaced by Adolf Hitler.

Book and episode cliffhangers
The book episodes invariably end with a cliffhanger which is resolved in the next issue in one or two panels. For instance, when manager Tommy Brown revealed that 'he' was actually a woman in disguise, the following episode had her leaving the country for ever and being replaced by her identical twin brother.
 When someone stole a bag containing the gate money, which Syd Preston had left on a table beneath a small air vent, it was theorised that only a contortionist from the local circus could have entered the room. However Syd then realised that, now that he thought about it, he had actually left the bag on a different table - where indeed it was.
 Billy was convicted of the murder of his wife and children, and was about to be executed. In the nick of time his family turned up to say that they weren't dead; they had merely been out shopping.

The television series had cliffhangers at the end of each of the 4 episodes that were broadcast:Episode OneThe team are given a lift to Rossdale Stadium in Rick Spangle's jet plane. Suddenly, Spangles peels off his head to reveal an alien underneath it. The team discover they are his prisoners and that the plane is going to Mars...Episode TwoBilly is at a death camp in Botslavia. He has been sent there for a punishment for signing a written confession to crimes perpetrated against the Botslavian states. Several guns are pointed at him, and Billy says: "Oh, well. This looks like the end." Once given the orders, the soldiers open fire...Episode ThreeGus Parker announces that when the match takes place on Saturday, Grimthorpe City will win the league trophy, and no fish, large breasted Indian or invisible striker is going to stop them...Episode Four'''

The narrator explains that the final whistle had blown before the ball had crossed the line, which means that Grimthorpe City are champions of the league trophy. But he is wrong. The referee apologizes for blowing the whistle. He was just testing it. Fulchester are champions of the league trophy.

Animated filmBilly The Fish was made into an animated movie by Channel 4 in 1990. It told the story of how Billy joined Fulchester United. When it aired on Channel 4 in June 1990, it was shown as a full omnibus film. It was shown again on Channel 4 in January 1991, however this time it was split into four episodes and featured the voice of comedian Harry Enfield. The programme aired every Saturday from 8 to 22 January from 5:00 to 5:30. This then spawned "The Viz Billy the Fish Football Yearbook", which described itself as The Official Book of the cartoon of the Comic of the Channel 4 T.V. series of the cartoon Billy the Fish.

All the characters were voiced in Scouse accents (apart from Syd, who had a Scottish accent). It was the only Viz cartoon to get a "U" certificate on its release, rather than "18" as the other Viz videos earned (or 15 in the case of Roger Mellie). When they were updated for DVD release in 2004, Billy the Fish was the only one not to get its own release, instead being included as an extra feature on the Roger Mellie DVD. In the second episode of Billy The Fish, Roger Mellie made a cameo on a television.

 Episode One 
The film begins with the narrator explaining that young Billy Thompson was determined to be a football player, despite being born half-man/half fish. One day at the local park, he plays a game of football and the players think he is great. Tommy Brown, the manager of Fulchester United offers Billy a contract to join the team. But nearby, Gus Parker, evil manager of Grimthorpe City is watching and tells his sidekick Wilf that Billy is too good. Wilf explains that Grimforth won't stand a chance against Fulchester on Saturday. Gus Parker tells Wilf that they should arrange a "little holiday" for Billy. Later that week at Fulchester Stadium, the team coach Syd Preston has some bad news for Tommy Brown. He tells him Billy Thompson has been kidnapped and that Fulchester have little chance to play at the football match on Saturday. Meanwhile, Wilf and Evil Gus Parker are with Billy Thompson who has been tied to a football goal post. He tells Wilf that on Saturday, Billy will line up for Fulchester. He shows him a balloon of Billy which isn't the REAL Billy Thompson, but a lifesize replica of him. Saturday arrives and the crowd thinks Billy won't make it. But suddenly, Billy's inflatable replica floats out of the tunnel. Tommy Brown comments that Billy must have escaped with only seconds to spare. Soon the game starts but Billy's replica doesn't do anything. The crowd discover that the Grimforth player scored. They think Billy is rubbish and boo him. Meanwhile, the real Billy is with evil Gus Parker and Wilf. He has hidden Billy in the middle of the Grimforth City goal post. Mr Ramano, a hypnotist hypnotises Billy and tells him he will play for Grimforth City. Meanwhile, after only 20 minutes, Fulchester are 11 goals down to Grimforth City. Thanks to Billy's replica, the game has had a disappointing start. This will be Billy's first and last game for Fulchester United.

At that very moment, an arm reaches out of a window overlooking the grounds and points a shotgun at Billy's replica. A voice says that "this is the last game that Billy The Fish will ever play!" and pulls the trigger. There is an explosion and the crowd gasps. A player says that Billy must been exploded. Because Billy has been kidnapped and assassinated, Terry Jackson, the unsettled reserve team keeper will take his place. The game restarts. But as Jackson is about to kick the ball, two policemen put their hands on his shoulders. One shows him a rifle he had in his locker and they arrest him for killing Billy The Fish. Tommy Brown is not happy - with one keeper exploding and the next one being arrested this is just the kind of start the team doesn't need, but Syd Preston says that with 45 minutes left, the game could still continue either way. Meanwhile, Evil Gus Parker says that Fulchester United are out of the cup. Mr Ramano tells him that Billy is dead. Meanwhile, in the changing room, Syd Preston discovers the team has fallen asleep and the game restarts in 2 minutes. Tommy Brown tells Syd the team had been drugged and that he hired a team of actors to play them in the first half of the game. The real team are in a broom cupboard, wide awake and ready for the second half. As the second half begins, a player trips over something. It is a gravestone. On it, it says: R.I.P. Billy The Fish. Everyone discovers Billy is dead and has been buried on the pitch. Tommy Brown says that 64-year-old Rex Finnley is the team's only chance. At once, Rex scores 12 goals and the crowd thinks he is amazing! But just as he is about to score the 13th goal, a Grimforth player trips him and he falls over. There is a loud voice and everyone stops. It is Maxwell Baxter. He tells everyone he has just bought Fulchester Stadium and plans to build a supermarket, saying that demolition will begin at once. But one of the players finds it is not Baxter but a cardboard replica with a hidden tape recorder.

The game rebegins with Rex about to do the kick that will win the game. As he kicks the ball, the crowd discovers he aimed at the floodlights. Tommy Brown says that Rex has had a disappointing effort, but suddenly high above the stadium, the ball turns, flies into the goalpost and GOAL! Fulchester United have won, and right on the final whistle! Syd and Tommy Brown talk about how fantastic Rex has been. The furious Gus Parker shakes his fist, yelling: "We'll meet again, Fulchester!" In the changing room, Tommy congratulates Rex. Rex tells him the ball has a highly advanced jet engine controlled from inside it. Tommy Brown knows the only person who's small enough to fit inside the ball - Billy The Fish. Billy is alive and well. He explains that his small fish like body is the obvious choice to fly Rex's jet-powered air craft football. There is suddenly a voice from behind everyone. Once again it is Maxwell Baxter. He accuses everyone of cheating and threatens to discredit Fulchester out of the cup competition and the football league. But once again, Syd discovers it is not the real Maxwell Baxter, but another cardboard replica with a hidden tape recorder.

The next evening, before the cup clash with Rossdale Rovers, Tommy Brown introduces the team to their new member - Shakin' Stevens! Billy tells him: "I've got all your records! Welcome to the team!" while Syd Preston explains that Stevens could be just the person the team needs for tonight's match with the Rossdale Rovers. But as the team leave the tunnel, they discover the ground is empty! Syd explains the place where they are is their own ground - Fulchester Stadium! Tommy Brown tells him someone must have moved the road signs, leading the team around in circles. Now they are 200 miles from Rossdale, and the game is about to kick off in one minute. As Syd explains the team will never reach Rossdale in one minute, Tommy discovers the clock on the grandstand. It says 6:30. He suddenly remembers that the clocks went back an hour the previous evening, and that he forgot to change his watch. Billy tells him the team won't reach Rossdale in an hour, Tommy tells them they will - in the jet plane of their chairman and millionaire popstar, Rick Spangles. He tells everyone: "Hop in lads, and hold on tight." Soon the plane is in the air, and Spangles makes an announcement that there has been a slight change in destination. He pulls off the front of his face to reveal a Martian underneath. He tells the team the plane is going to Mars. It turns into an alien spaceship...

 Episode Two 
But as a Rossdale player counts down 10 seconds on his watch, he, the referee and another player look up and see the alien spaceship with the team lowering themselves to the ground with a rope. The game starts and soon Shakin' Stevens is ready. Two football fans comment on his moves. Tommy says to Syd that Steven's movement is incredible, but his control is letting him down. Suddenly, Stevens trips on the ball. He is out cold! The second fan says Stevens seems to have taken a nasty knock. Syd calls out for a stretcher and says to Tommy that Stevens will no longer be able to take part in the game. Meanwhile, on the pitch, a player is struggling to run. A Grimforth player comments: "Ha Ha! Too slow! I'll take that!" The pressure is well and truly honest on the players. At half time, they discover their boots have been filled with lead. Someone is out to make trouble for Fulchester United. The question is who?

The match continues and Billy catches the ball but it bursts! The referee decides to cancel the match and toss a coin to decide the results. The results are heads - Rossdale win. Billy calls tails. Tails it is. The next one is the decider. It is tails again. Fulchester is the winner! The next day, the team are heading for their training ground, however, it has been replaced with a multi story car park. Tommy comments that this is the work of Gus Parker. This also leaves the team with nowhere to train for the cup trip to distant Botslavia. Billy suggests training on the plane and Syd thinks this is a great idea. Tommy plans to order some exercise bikes. Meanwhile, evil Gus Parker and Wilf have come up with a plan: dressed as Fulchester supporters and with their minds poisoned by alcohol, they'll behave like animals, causing the authorities to ban Fulchester from all competitions...

The next day as the plane heads over the North Sea, Tommy Brown discovers Syd Preston has been replaced with a life size dummy packed with explosions. It explodes, causing the team to fall into the North Sea. However, seconds later, Tommy has an idea - the exercise bikes on board the plane can used to make a boat. Shortly, the boat has been built but it may take the team several hours to reach Botslavia. Someone will have to swim to Botslavia ahead of the team and hold the fort until they arrive. Billy volunteers and sets off. Meanwhile, in the bar of a nearby ferry, Gus Parker and Wilf are drunk after 58 pints. As they leave the ferry (still drunk of course) and head for the dock, they are stopped by a soldier with a gun. He says this is not the kind of behaviour they tolerate in Botslavia and sentences them both to 30 years in prison...

At the Kadaza stadium, Billy is revealed to be the only Fulchester player in sight. As the match begins, time and time again, his fish like brilliance keeps his side in the game. Before long, Fulchester have taken the league right on the state of half time. During the interval, Bongo manager Terry Vegetables asks Billy to sign for Bongo for £10,000. Billy accepts and signs, however, hearing a laugh from Vegetables, he discovers he has been tricked! He has actually signed a written confession to crimes perpetuated against the Botslavian state! The punishment is death! Terry gives an order and two guards grab Billy's arms. Before long, Billy is blindfolded and tied to an execution post at a Botslavia death camp. The soldiers point their weapons at him and Billy replies: "Oh, well. This looks like the end." The chief gives the order to fire, and the soldiers pull the triggers on their guns...

 Episode Three 
Billy hears Syd Preston calling his name and wonders where he is. Syd tells him everything is OK - he bumped his head on a goal post. Billy realizes he had been dreaming. The postman calls at the Stadium with a letter for Billy. It is from Graham Trailer. He asks Billy to play against Moveinya in the World Cup. Billy is thrilled - it is like a dream come true. But that evening as Billy arrives at the stadium and heads onto the turf, he discovers the ground is empty. He discovers he has become the victim of a cruel hoax. Unseen by Billy, a mysterious hand turns a handle. The man who Billy believed to Graham Trailer must have been an evil and talented impressionist. He sees the doors are locked. He also notices a hose has been left running! Soon the water level inside the ground will begin to rise - and poor Billy will be drowned! Meanwhile, Tommy Brown is called in to see Rick Spangles. He's not happy with Saturday's result and tells Tommy he is fired. Tommy tells him Fulchester won. However, Spangles tells Tommy it's in the best interest in Fulchester United's football club and turns his attention to a Mister Smith (who is really Gus Parker). "Smith" says he has always wanted to be a football manager. Spangles gives him the job and introduces him to Syd Preston. However, Syd doesn't figure in Gus Parker's big plans and so Parker sacks him. Later, the new boss is on the telephone at his desk. Speaking to the team Peddleworth Albion, he offers to swap all Fulchester's best players for their worst ones and plans to throw in Billy Thompson free of charge...

At a flooded Wembley Stadium, things are looking grim for Billy. The water level is rising fast. However, a sea rescue helicopter spots Billy and lifts him to safety. The next day, Billy and his friends report to their new stadium - Peddleworth Albion. Billy meets Tommy. He introduces Billy to the team's new members - Brown Fox and Johnny X, the invisible striker, who has been invisible since an accident in which his father, a scientist, was killed. At Fulchester Stadium, Gus Parker offers a bus driver £10,000 for some pensioners. The bus driver agrees and takes the cash. Gus is very pleased. After only a week in charge of Fulchester, he has sold off their best players and replaced them with pensioners. Within a week, Fulchester will go bust and with them out of the way for good, Parker will return to Grimforth City and win the league...

The next day, everyone is on the coach, preparing to set off to the football match at Redhurst. But Syd has lost the map! However, Brown Fox offers to lead them to Redhurst. They arrive there just in time. As the game gets under way, Billy's fish like brilliance is need to keep the high flying Redhurst players at bay. But suddenly, Redhurst 9 finds himself with only the keeper to beat. Billy discover he has been beaten on the edge of the 18-yard area. If 9 scores, the game is over. Another player prepares to score a goal. Tommy Brown is worried - a score at this point of the game would make the score one nil. But suddenly, an arrow (fired by Brown Fox) bursts the ball and saves the day for Peddleworth. With only seconds to go, Billy throws the ball to Johnny X who sends it to Brown Fox. She runs past the Redhurst players and kicks the ball towards the goal post. Johnny X sends it into the post, scoring a goal!

Everyone celebrates with a bath, however, they are not the only ones in the water - a shark is as well! However, Billy points it is only a nurse shark and it is harmless. The following morning, Tommy Brown notices that his former club Fulchester United is in deep financial trouble. He decides to call them and arrange a merger between the two clubs. Eventually, with the club name now Fulchester Albion, Tommy tells Syd that if they win the one remaining game against Grimforth City, they will be the league champions. But in a local pub, evil Gus Parker has heard what Tommy has said about the football match. He announces that on Saturday, Grimforth City will win the league trophy, and no fish, large breasted Indian or invisible striker is going to stop them...

 Episode Four 
Meanwhile, Tommy Brown is putting the finishing touches to Fulchester's preparations. But Billy flies into Brown Fox. Syd discovers Billy has injured his fin and could be out of action for six weeks. Brown Fox apologizes. On the day of the big match, Fulchester Stadium is buzzing with excitement. Gus Parker is delighted - with Billy out of the action, Grimforth are home and dry. However, as the teams emerge, the crowd is thrilled to discover Billy is playing after all, on a crutch! Syd says Billy has got a big heart. Tommy Brown says he has courage - he'll go out there and give 110 percent for the full 90 minutes. But as the game gets under way, Billy is beaten up by the Grimforth players. Suddenly, Grimforth break away on the left leg. However, for Billy, it becomes an own goal.

In the changing room, Billy can hardly move his fin. However, Brown Fox knows a special Indian dance and demonstrates it to Tommy and Syd. Soon, Billy's fin is as good as new. The game restarts with Johnny X passing the football into the goalpost, making a goal. But with the scores level, Grimforth still have the advantage, only needing a draw to remain ahead and win the league trophy. Gus Parker orders them to "take no chances!" With only seconds left, Billy starts a move from inside his own 18-yard area. He passes the ball to Brown Fox, causing her to control it with her breasts, but this only causes the referee to give out a penalty.

A deathly hush falls on Fulchester Stadium. It is all up to Billy now. He is the only one that can save the team.  However, a save won't be enough. A goal is also needed at the other end in order to win. Billy prepares to make a split second decision: to dart to the left or to the right? The ball is kicked towards him, but Billy notices it's going the other way! Billy has to change direction before it is too late! Groaning loudly in pain, he manages to move towards the ball and divert it! The ball moves over to Brown Fox who passes it on. But before the ball has crossed the line, the final whistle blows for the end of the match. The narrator announces that Grimforth City have won the match instead of Fulchester United, and they are champions of the league trophy....

But the players are wrong. The referee apologizes for blowing the whistle, saying that he was just testing it. He tells everyone that the goal stands and that Fulchester have won the league trophy and the match.

Other uses
 During his time in the Royal Air Force, Prince William was nicknamed Billy the Fish, a pun on his name and his father's title (Prince of Wales). The nickname also became his callsign.
 In the 2018 crime film King of Thieves'', Michael Gambon's character Billy Lincoln is nicknamed Billy the Fish.

References

British comics
1983 comics debuts
Comics characters introduced in 1983
Viz characters
Fictional British people
Fictional association football players
Fictional fish
Humor comics
Parody comics
Parodies of comics
Association football comics